This is a List of Casualties During Price's Missouri Expedition during the American Civil War.

Union

Confederate

References

Price's Missouri Expedition
Casualties
Missouri history-related lists
1864 in Missouri